Rector Street may refer to:

These New York City subway stations in Manhattan:
Rector Street (IRT Broadway–Seventh Avenue Line), serving the  train
Rector Street (BMT Broadway Line), serving the  trains
Rector Street (IRT Sixth Avenue Line), former elevated station, now demolished
Rector Street (IRT Ninth Avenue Line), former elevated station, now demolished